Facebook has been involved in multiple controversies involving censorship of content, removing or omitting information from its services in order to comply with company policies, legal demands, and government censorship laws.

Anti-immigrant speech 
In Germany, Facebook actively censors anti-immigrant speech, claiming they are reviewing posts more stringently and using legal opinions and language experts to determine whether users' comments are infringing on German law.

In May 2016, Facebook and other technology companies agreed to a new "code of conduct" by the European Commission to review hateful online content within 24 hours of being notified, and subsequently remove such content if necessary. A year later, Reuters reported that the European Union had approved proposals to make Facebook and other technology companies tackle hate speech content on their platforms, but that a final agreement in the European Parliament is needed to make the proposals into law. In June 2017, the European Commission praised Facebook's efforts in fighting hateful content, having reviewed "nearly 58 percent of flagged content within 24 hours".

"Blasphemous" content 
Facebook has worked with Pakistani government to censor "blasphemous" pages and speech inside Pakistan, censoring 54 posts in the second half of 2014.

Climate change 
Facebook has censored several posts related to climate change. It uses the group Climate Feedback for its fact-checking related to climate change.

Competing social networks 

In October 2018, Facebook and Facebook Messenger was said to be blocking urls to Minds, a social network website that is a competitor of Facebook. Users have complained that Facebook marks links to Facebook's competitor as "insecure" and have to fill a captcha to share it with other users. In 2015, Facebook was accused of banning rival network Tsu in a similar manner.

Conservative news 
In May 2016, Facebook was accused by a former employee of leaving out conservative topics from the trending bar. Although Facebook denied these allegations, the site planned to improve the trending bar.

In August 2018, Facebook deleted videos posted to it by PragerU. Facebook later reversed its decision and restored the PragerU content, saying that PragerU content was falsely reported to have hate speech.

As a result of perception that conservatives are not treated neutrally on Facebook, alternative social media platforms have been established. This perception has led to a reduction of trust in Facebook, and reduction of usage by those who consider themselves to be conservative.

In July 2020, Congressman Matt Gaetz filed a criminal referral against Facebook citing that evidence produced by Project Veritas demonstrated that Facebook CEO, Mark Zuckerberg, had made materially false statements to Congress while under oath in hearings which occurred in April 2018. Congressman Gaetz claimed that the evidence provided demonstrated that Zuckerberg's claims that the website did not engage in bias against conservative speech were false.

COVID-19 vaccines 
Facebook has been accused of censoring several posts related to COVID-19 vaccines. In October 2020, Facebook is said to have censored a claim the COVID-19 vaccines were imminent. On 2 November 2021, The BMJ published a piece by journalist Paul D. Thacker alleging there has been "poor practice" at Ventavia, one of the companies involved in the phase III evaluation trials of the Pfizer vaccine. The BMJ sent an open letter to Mark Zuckerberg explaining that "from November 10, readers began reporting a variety of problems when trying to share our article. Some reported being unable to share it. Many others reported having their posts flagged with a warning about "Missing context ... Independent fact-checkers say this information could mislead people." Those trying to post the article were informed by Facebook that people who repeatedly share "false information" might have their posts moved lower in Facebook's News Feed. Group administrators where the article was shared received messages from Facebook informing them that such posts were "partly false." Readers were directed to a "fact check" performed by a Facebook contractor named Lead Stories.".

Criticism of Facebook 

Newspapers regularly report stories of users who claim they've been censored on Facebook for being critical of Facebook itself, with their posts removed or made less visible. Examples include Elizabeth Warren in 2019 and Rotem Shtarkman in 2016.

Facebook has systems to monitor specific terms and keywords and trigger automatic or semi-automatic action. In the context of media reports and lawsuits from people formerly working on Facebook content moderation, a former Facebook moderator (Chris Gray) has claimed that specific rules existed to monitor and sometimes target posts about Facebook which are anti-Facebook or criticize Facebook for some action, for instance by matching the keywords "Facebook" or "DeleteFacebook".

Criticism of the Israeli government 

Facebook has been accused of censoring messages critical of Israel and supportive of Palestine. During conflict over the Sheikh Jarrah property dispute in 2021 Facebook was accused of deleting hundreds of posts critical of Israel. Senior Facebook officials apologized to the Palestinian Prime Minister for censoring pro-Palestinian voices.

Search function 
Facebook's search function has been accused of preventing users from searching for certain terms. Michael Arrington of TechCrunch has written about Facebook's possible censorship of "Ron Paul" as a search term. MoveOn.org's Facebook group for organizing protests against privacy violations could for a time not be found by searching. The very word privacy was also restricted.

Image censorship 
Facebook has a policy of removing photos which they believe violate the terms and conditions of the website. Images have been removed from user pages on topics such as breastfeeding, nudity in art, apparent breasts, naked mannequins, kisses between persons of the same sex and family photos.

In September 2016, Norwegian author Tom Egeland published Nick Ut's iconic napalm girl photo on his Facebook page as part of a list of iconic war time photographs. He was banned for publishing "a picture of a nude child". A few weeks later, the newspaper Aftenposten published an open letter to Zuckerberg after the banning of "Napalm Girl", a Pulitzer Prize-winning documentary photograph from the Vietnam War made by Nick Ut. Half of the ministers in the Norwegian government shared the famous Nick Ut photo on their Facebook pages, among them prime minister Erna Solberg from the Conservative Party (Høyre). But after only a few hours, several of the Facebook posts, including the Prime Minister's post, were deleted by Facebook.

As a reaction to the letter, Facebook reconsidered its opinion on this picture and republished it, recognizing "the history and global importance of this image in documenting a particular moment in time".

Breastfeeding photos 
Facebook has been repeatedly criticized for removing photos uploaded by mothers breastfeeding their babies. Although photos that show an exposed breast violate Facebook's decency code, photos were removed even when the baby covered the nipple.

The breastfeeding photo controversy continued following public protests and the growth in membership of a Facebook group titled "Hey, Facebook, breastfeeding is not obscene! (Official petition to Facebook)." In December 2011, Facebook removed photos of mothers breastfeeding and after public criticism, restored the photos. The company said it removed the photos they believed violated the pornographic rules in the company's terms and conditions. During February 2012, the company renewed its policy of removing photos of mothers breastfeeding. Founders of a Facebook group "Respect the Breast" reported that "women say they are tired of people lashing out at what is natural and what they believe is healthy for their children."

Censorship of editorial content 
On February 4, 2010, a number of Facebook groups against the Democratic Alliance for the Betterment and Progress of Hong Kong (DAB) were removed without any reason given. The DAB is one of the largest pro-Beijing political parties in Hong Kong. The affected groups have since been restored.

Censorship on the Kashmir freedom movement 
In 2016, Facebook banned and also removed content regarding the Kashmir dispute, triggering a response from The Guardian, BBC and other media groups on Facebook's policies on censorship. Facebook censorship policies have been criticized especially after the company banned the posts about the Indian army's attack on protesters, including children, with pellet guns. A human rights group superimposed pellet injuries similar to those inflicted on Kashmiri people on the faces of popular Indian actors, famous people including Facebook founder Mark Zuckerberg and even Prime Minister Narendra Modi as a response, which went viral.

Kurdish opposition censorship 
Facebook has a policy to censor anything related to Kurdish opposition against Turkey, such as maps of Kurdistan, flags of Kurdish armed terrorist groups (such as PKK and YPG), and criticism of Mustafa Kemal Atatürk, the founder of Turkey.

Censorship in line with US foreign policy 
In October 2021, a secret blacklist of "dangerous individuals and organizations" maintained by Facebook was discovered by The Intercept, which revealed censorship in the MENA region was stricter than in USA. Critics and scholars have argued the blacklist and the guideline stifles free discussion, as well as enforcing an uneven enforcement of the rules.

See also 
Criticism of Facebook
Censorship by Google
Censorship by Apple
Issues involving social networking services

References 

Facebook
Facebook
Facebook criticisms and controversies
Censorship
Prejudices